Bagh Sangan or Bagh-e Sangan may refer to:
 Bagh Sangan-e Olya
 Bagh Sangan-e Sofla